Great Expectations is a lost 1917 silent drama film directed by Robert G. Vignola and Paul West, based on the 1861 novel Great Expectations by Charles Dickens. Jack Pickford stars as Pip and Louise Huff as Estella.

Plot summary

Cast
 Jack Pickford as Pip
 Louise Huff as Estella
 Frank Losee as Abel Magwitch, alias Provis
 William Black as Joe Gargery
 Marcia Harris as Mrs. Gargery
 Grace Barton as Miss Havisham
 Herbert Prior as Mr. Jaggers

References

External links

 
 
 
 

1917 films
1917 drama films
American black-and-white films
1910s English-language films
Films based on Great Expectations
Films directed by Robert G. Vignola
American silent feature films
Silent American drama films
Lost American films
Films set in London
Paramount Pictures films
1917 lost films
Lost drama films
1910s American films